Pellenes obvolutus is a species of jumping spiders that lives in Kenya. It was first described in 2016.

References

Endemic fauna of Kenya
Fauna of Kenya
Salticidae
Spiders described in 2016
Spiders of Africa
Taxa named by Wanda Wesołowska